William Haade (March 2, 1903 – November 15, 1966) was an American film actor. He appeared in more than 250 films between 1937 and 1957. He was born in New York City  and died in Los Angeles, California.

Haade was a construction boss until he began acting, appearing in Iron Men (1936) on Broadway. A technical advisor to Norman Bel Geddes recommended Haade to his boss, who was seeking a fresh face for the play's lead.

Selected filmography

 Kid Galahad (1937) - Chuck McGraw
 Telephone Operator (1937) - Heaver
 Missing Witnesses (1937) - Emmet White
 The Invisible Menace (1938) - Pvt. Ferris
 Hollywood Stadium Mystery (1938) - Tommy Madison - the Champ
 Bulldog Drummond's Peril (1938) - Botulian's Driver (uncredited)
 He Couldn't Say No (1938) - Slug, a Gangster
 Three Comrades (1938) - Younger Vogt Man at Wrecked Car Scene (uncredited)
 My Bill (1938) - Piano Mover (uncredited)
 The Amazing Dr. Clitterhouse (1938) - Mrs. Updyke's Watchman (uncredited)
 The Texans (1938) - Sgt. Cahill (uncredited)
 Sing You Sinners (1938) - Pete
 If I Were King (1938) - Guy Tabarie
 Down on the Farm (1938) - Hefferkamp
 Shadows Over Shanghai (1938) - Captain Murphy
 Tom Sawyer, Detective (1938) - Jupiter Dunlap
 Persons in Hiding (1939) - First Mate (uncredited)
 Pardon Our Nerve (1939) - Daniels (uncredited)
 Union Pacific (1939) - Dusky Clayton
 Unmarried (1939) - Waiter (uncredited)
 The Gracie Allen Murder Case (1939) - Hotel Doorman (uncredited)
 Night Work (1939) - Mr. Turk
 Island of Lost Men (1939) - Hambly
 Full Confession (1939) - Moore
 $1,000 a Touchdown (1939) - Guard (uncredited)
 Sabotage (1939) - Minor Role (uncredited)
 Sued for Libel (1939) - Cooper, Pomeroy's Chauffeur (uncredited)
 Kid Nightingale (1939) - Rocky Snyder
 Rulers of the Sea (1939) - A Stoker
 Geronimo (1939) - McNeil
 Reno (1939) - George Fields
 Invisible Stripes (1939) - Shrank
 The Earl of Chicago (1940) - Crapshooter (uncredited)
 The Man Who Wouldn't Talk (1940) - First American (uncredited)
 The Grapes of Wrath (1940) - Deputy with Shotgun (uncredited)
 The Saint's Double Trouble (1940) - Helm Van Roon aka 'The Dutchman' (uncredited)
 The Man from Dakota (1940) - Union Soldier
 Adventure in Diamonds (1940) - Tattooed American Sailor (uncredited)
 Millionaire Playboy (1940) - Policeman (uncredited)
 Johnny Apollo (1940) - Guard During Break (uncredited)
 And One Was Beautiful (1940) - Prison Guard (uncredited)
 Bullet Code (1940) - Scar Atwood
 Lillian Russell (1940) - Soldier
 Sandy Is a Lady (1940) - Truck Driver
 Private Affairs (1940) - Strong-Arm Robber (uncredited)
 Stage to Chino (1940) - Slim
 They Drive By Night (1940) - Tough Driver (uncredited)
 One Crowded Night (1940) - Joe
 Girl from Avenue A (1940) - Second Doorman (uncredited)
 Brigham Young (1940) - Skeptic (uncredited)
 Flowing Gold (1940) - Man Waiting for Job (uncredited)
 Knute Rockne All American (1940) - Worker (scenes deleted)
 Cherokee Strip (1940) - Grimes
 North West Mounted Police (1940) - Armorer (uncredited)
 Who Killed Aunt Maggie? (1940) - Trooper Curtis
 Dr. Kildare's Crisis (1940) - Guirk, Man in Fistfight (uncredited)
 Robin Hood of the Pecos (1941) - Captain Jeff Morgan
 The Round Up (1941) - Frane Battles
 The Penalty (1941) - Van
 In Old Cheyenne (1941) - Davidge
 Men of Boys Town (1941) - Jake, Reform School Guard (uncredited)
 The People vs. Dr. Kildare (1941) - Iron Worker at Mike's (uncredited)
 Affectionately Yours (1941) - Matthews
 Pirates on Horseback (1941) - Henchman Bill Watson
 Desert Bandit (1941) - Largo
 Man Hunt (1941) - Third Sentry (uncredited)
 Hurry, Charlie, Hurry (1941) - Policeman in Park (uncredited)
 Kansas Cyclone (1941) - Sheriff Ed King
 Sergeant York (1941) - Card Player (uncredited)
 Accent on Love (1941) - Court Attendant (uncredited)
 Dance Hall (1941) - Moon
 The Shepherd of the Hills (1941) - Bald Knobber (uncredited)
 Citadel of Crime (1941) - Turk
 Unfinished Business (1941) - Drill Sergeant (uncredited)
 Sailors on Leave (1941) - Sawyer
 Honky Tonk (1941) - Heckler in Church (uncredited)
 Married Bachelor (1941) - Angry Husband (uncredited)
 Rise and Shine (1941) - Butch
 You're in the Army Now (1941) - Sergeant Thorpe
 Don't Get Personal (1942) - Burly Man Beach Bully (uncredited)
 Man from Cheyenne (1942) - Ed
 Right to the Heart (1942) - Morgan
 Torpedo Boat (1942) - Big Sweeney, Riveter
 Heart of the Rio Grande (1942) - Hap Callahan
 Reap the Wild Wind (1942) - 'Jubilee' Second Mate (uncredited)
 To the Shores of Tripoli (1942) - Truck Driver (uncredited)
 Shepherd of the Ozarks (1942) - Dudd Hitt
 Gang Busters (1942, Serial) - Mike Taboni
 A Gentleman After Dark (1942) - Policeman
 You're Telling Me (1942) - Doorman (uncredited)
 The Spoilers (1942) - Deputy Joe (uncredited)
 Dr. Broadway (1942) - Dynamo (uncredited)
 Juke Girl (1942) - Watchman
 Maisie Gets Her Man (1942) - Bonecrusher (uncredited)
 Jackass Mail (1942) - Red Gargan
 Just Off Broadway (1942) - Warehouse Watchman
 Iceland (1942) - Sentry (uncredited)
 The Navy Comes Through (1942) - Pier 7 Guard (uncredited)
 I Married a Witch (1942) - Policeman at Ambulance (uncredited)
 Heart of the Golden West (1942) - Cully Bronson - Henchman
 Star Spangled Rhythm (1942) - Marine Sergeant Duffy (uncredited)
 Pittsburgh (1942) - Johnny
 How's About It (1943) - Attendant (uncredited)
 Hangmen Also Die! (1943) - Mildrad (uncredited)
 She Has What It Takes (1943) - Cop (uncredited)
 Daredevils of the West (1943, Serial) - Barton Ward - Henchman
 Dr. Gillespie's Criminal Case (1943) - Butch - Prison Driver (uncredited)
 Days of Old Cheyenne (1943) - Big Bill Harmon
 Action in the North Atlantic (1943) - Loudmouth Saloon Patron (uncredited)
 Two Tickets to London (1943) - Groves (uncredited)
 Song of Texas (1943) - Fred Calvert
 Salute to the Marines (1943) - M.P. Sergeant (uncredited)
 The Adventures of a Rookie (1943) - Army Sergeant on Ship (uncredited)
 Adventures of the Flying Cadets (1943, Serial) - Instructor (uncredited)
 Dangerous Blondes (1943) - Pugnacious Man (uncredited)
 Thank Your Lucky Stars (1943) - Finchley the Butler (uncredited)
 A Scream in the Dark (1943) - Gerald Messenger
 You're a Lucky Fellow, Mr. Smith (1943) - Soldier (uncredited)
 Minesweeper (1943) - Bosun (uncredited)
 The Dancing Masters (1943) - Truck Driver (uncredited)
 There's Something About a Soldier (1943) - Larsky (uncredited)
 Whistling in Brooklyn (1943) - Police Sergeant (uncredited)
 Sing a Jingle (1944) - Announcer (uncredited)
 Timber Queen (1944) - Rawson (uncredited)
 Buffalo Bill (1944) - Barber (uncredited)
 Seven Days Ashore (1944) - Bosun's Mate (uncredited)
 Slightly Terrific (1944) - Olaf (uncredited)
 The Adventures of Mark Twain (1944) - Steam Room Chief (uncredited)
 Show Business (1944) - Stagehand (uncredited)
 3 Men in White (1944) - Policeman (uncredited)
 Roger Touhy, Gangster (1944) - Carl - Truck Driver (uncredited)
 Man from Frisco (1944) - Brooklyn (uncredited)
 The Yellow Rose of Texas (1944) - Buster
 Bride by Mistake (1944) - Guard (uncredited)
 An American Romance (1944) - Passerby at Music Teacher's Home (uncredited)
 I Won't Play (1944, Short) - Chicago
 Here Come the Waves (1944) - Chief Petty Officer (uncredited)
 Sheriff of Las Vegas (1944) - Dan Sedley
 Bring On the Girls (1945) - Chief Petty Officer (uncredited)
 The Master Key (1945, Serial) - Abandoned Warehouse Thug (uncredited)
 Honeymoon Ahead (1945) - Trigger
 Pillow to Post (1945) - Big Joe - Loolie's Drunken Date (uncredited)
 The Frozen Ghost (1945) - Policeman on Dock (uncredited)
 I'll Tell the World (1945) - Joe (uncredited)
 Nob Hill (1945) - Big Tim, El Dorado Owner (uncredited)
 Incendiary Blonde (1945) - Mug with Cadden (uncredited)
 Pride of the Marines (1945) - Man at Bus Stop (uncredited)
 Phantom of the Plains (1945) - Ace Hanlon
 The Royal Mounted Rides Again (1945) - Archer
 Dakota (1945) - Roughneck in Saloon (uncredited)
 Fallen Angel (1945) - 1st Bus Driver (uncredited)
 The Stork Club (1945) - Army Sergeant Dancing with Judy (uncredited)
 A Guy Could Change (1946) - Hank Krane
 The Gentleman Misbehaves (1946) - Officer (uncredited)
 Sentimental Journey (1946) - Bus Driver (uncredited)
 The Well-Groomed Bride (1946) - MP (uncredited)
 Valley of the Zombies (1946) - Police Officer 'Tiny'
 In Old Sacramento (1946) - Claim Jumper (uncredited)
 Renegades (1946) - Bert, Gunman (uncredited)
 My Pal Trigger (1946) - Davis
 Gentleman Joe Palooka (1946) - Goon Leader (uncredited)
 The Magnificent Rogue (1946) - Cop (uncredited)
 Affairs of Geraldine (1946) - Wayne Cooper
 Bringing Up Father (1946) - Tillie O'Toole (uncredited)
 Lady Chaser (1946) - Bill Redding
 The Pilgrim Lady (1947) - Cab Driver
 It Happened in Brooklyn (1947) - Police Sergeant
 Buck Privates Come Home (1947) - Eustice (Laundry Woman's Husband) (uncredited)
 Blaze of Noon (1947) - Man in Speakeasy (uncredited)
 The Web (1947) - Plainclothesman (uncredited)
 The Trouble with Women (1947) - Cap (uncredited)
 Deep Valley (1947) - Guard (uncredited)
 The Secret Life of Walter Mitty (1947) - Conductor (uncredited)
 Down to Earth (1947) - Spike
 Exposed (1947) - Iggy Broty
 Unconquered (1947) - Trapper at Ball (uncredited)
 Magic Town (1947) - Moving Man with Wastebasket (uncredited)
 Where There's Life (1947) - Jimmy O'Brien (uncredited)
 Big Town After Dark (1947) - Marcus
 Under Colorado Skies (1947) - Marlowe
 The Inside Story (1948) - Rocky
 April Showers (1948) - Mike's Bartender (uncredited)
 The Emperor Waltz (1948) - Guard Officer (uncredited)
 Shaggy (1948) - Gonnell
 Lulu Belle (1948) - Duke Weaver (uncredited)
 Tap Roots (1948) - Mob Leader (uncredited)
 Key Largo (1948) - Ralph Feeney
 Four Faces West (1948) - Poker Player #1
 Michael O'Halloran (1948) - Detective Benson
 Night Has a Thousand Eyes (1948) - Gowan (uncredited)
 For the Love of Mary (1948) - (uncredited)
 Good Sam (1948) - Taxi Driver (scenes deleted)
 A Song Is Born (1948) - Detective from D.A.'s Office (uncredited)
 Incident (1948) - Police Desk Sergeant (uncredited)
 Strike It Rich (1948) - Bull
 That Wonderful Urge (1948) - Herman (uncredited)
 Last of the Wild Horses (1948) - Henchman Rocky Rockford
 Alaska Patrol (1949) - Anorus
 The Bribe (1949) - Walker (uncredited)
 Knock on Any Door (1949) - Police Sergeant (uncredited)
 Flamingo Road (1949) - Burr Lassen (uncredited)
 The Doolins of Oklahoma (1949) - Emmett Dalton (uncredited)
 Night Unto Night (1949) - Guy Morell, Man in Art Museum (uncredited)
 The Fountainhead(1949) - Worker (uncredited)
 Any Number Can Play (1949) - Frank, a Dealer (uncredited)
 The Wyoming Bandit (1949) - Lonnigan - Henchman
 Scene of the Crime (1949) - Lafe Douque
 The Gal Who Took the West (1949) - Lee's Man (uncredited)
 The Woman on Pier 13 (1949) - Worker Being Laid Off (uncredited)
 Malaya (1949) - Ship Captain (uncredited)
 Ambush (1950) - Joe - Guard (uncredited)
 No Man of Her Own (1950) - Policeman (uncredited)
 Outcast of Black Mesa (1950) - Dayton
 Rock Island Trail (1950) - Morrow's Henchman (uncredited)
 Father of the Bride (1950) - Policeman (uncredited)
 The Asphalt Jungle (1950) - Bill - Cop Outside Diner (uncredited)
 Hi-Jacked (1950) - Highway Patrol Inspector (uncredited)
 Trial Without Jury (1950) - Kennedy - Truck Driver
 The Old Frontier (1950) - Henchman Pills
 Triple Trouble (1950) - Arresting Policeman (uncredited)
 Copper Canyon (1950) - Laughing Poker Game Bystander (uncredited)
 Joe Palooka in the Squared Circle (1950) - Robert 'Bubbles' Conway
 Hunt the Man Down (1950) - Bart (uncredited)
 Three Desperate Men (1951) - Bill Devlin
 A Yank in Korea (1951) - Cpl. Jawolski
 Oh! Susanna (1951) - Trooper Riorty
 Rawhide (1951) - Gil Scott (uncredited)
 Stop That Cab (1951) - Onslow
 Santa Fe (1951) - Union Veteran (uncredited)
 Buckaroo Sheriff of Texas (1951) - Henchman Mark Brannigan
 The Texas Rangers (1951) - Guard on Train (uncredited)
 Leave It to the Marines (1951) - Recruiting Sgt. Delaney
 The Sea Hornet (1951) - Condor
 Here Come the Nelsons (1952) - Bully (uncredited)
 Rancho Notorious (1952) - Sheriff Sam Bullock (uncredited)
 And Now Tomorrow (1952)
 Skirts Ahoy! (1952) - Bosun's Mate (uncredited)
 Carson City (1952) - Hardrock Haggerty
 Bonzo Goes to College (1952) - Tom, Truck Driver (uncredited)
 Kansas City Confidential (1952) - Detective Mullins (uncredited)
 Come Back, Little Sheba (1952) - Interne (uncredited)
 San Antone (1953) - Yankee Sergeant (uncredited)
 The Blue Gardenia (1953) - Patrolman Hopper (uncredited)
 The Affairs of Dobie Gillis (1953) - Police Captain (uncredited)
 Red River Shore (1953) - Link - Henchman
 The Great Diamond Robbery (1954) - Mike, the Policeman (uncredited)
 Jubilee Trail (1954) - Jake - Sailor (uncredited)
 Untamed Heiress (1954) - Friend
 Silver Lode (1954) - Searcher at Dolly's Door (uncredited)
 Toughest Man Alive (1955)
 Abbott and Costello Meet the Keystone Kops (1955) - Hobo (uncredited)
 Many Rivers to Cross (1955) - The Constable (uncredited)
 The Road to Denver (1955) - Bartender #1 (uncredited)
 Spoilers of the Forest (1957) - Loader (uncredited)
 She Devil (1957) - Police Detective (uncredited)
 The Tall Stranger (1957) - Cattle Thief (uncredited)
 Revolt in the Big House (1958) - Guard (uncredited)

References

External links

1903 births
1966 deaths
American male film actors
Male actors from New York City
20th-century American male actors
Male Western (genre) film actors